Artificial or fake trees may refer to:
Artificial Christmas trees
Artificial trees used for Carbon dioxide removal#Direct air capture with carbon sequestration
Camouflage trees - World War I military technology